The men's doubles racquetball competition at the 2019 Pan American Games in Lima, Peru were held between August 2 and 7, 2019 at the Racquetball courts located at the Villa Deportiva Regional del Callao cluster. Javier Mar and Rodrigo Montoya of Mexico won gold in Men's Doubles. Their win was the third time a Mexican team has won gold in Men's Doubles in  Racquetball at the Pan American Games.

Schedule
All times are Central Standard Time (UTC-6).

Group stage

The competition begins with a round robin with athletes divided into groups. The results of the group stage were used to seed the teams for the medal round. Groups was announced at the technical meeting the day before the competition begins.

Pool A

Pool B

Pool C

Playoffs

References

External links
Results book

Racquetball at multi-sport events